The Plant Journal is a peer-reviewed scientific journal of plant science published by Wiley-Blackwell for the Society for Experimental Biology. It was established in 1991 and is currently edited by Lee Sweetlove. The journal is published twice per month.

Indexing and abstracting
The Plant Journal is abstracted and indexed in several bibliographic databases:

According to the Journal Citation Reports, the journal has a 2021 impact factor of 7.091, ranking it 17th out of 238 journals in the category "Plant Sciences".

References

Further reading

External links

The Plant Journal at the Society of Experimental Biology

Publications established in 1991
English-language journals
Wiley-Blackwell academic journals
Delayed open access journals
Semi-monthly journals
Botany journals